Eromanga or Erromanga may refer to:
 Eromanga, Queensland, Australia
Eromanga Refinery, a small oil refinery in the town
 Eromanga Basin, Australia
 Eromanga Sea, a prehistoric epicontinental sea that once covered the Eromanga Basin
 Erromanga or Erromango, formerly Martyr's Island, an island in Vanuatu
 Erromanga language, the primary language of the island
 Erromanga languages, a group of related languages
 Erromanga (ship), several ships named after the island
 Eromanga, from "Erotic" + "manga", one of the original Japanese terms for hentai manga
 Eromanga Sensei, a Japanese light novel and anime series